Aqa Ziarat (also Romanized as Āqā Zīārat, Āqā Zeyārat, and Āqā Zīyārat; also known as Āqzīārat) is a village in Farmahin Rural District, in the Central District of Farahan County, Markazi Province, Iran. At the 2006 census, its population was 402, in 99 families.

References 

Populated places in Farahan County